Roman Rafailovich Nagumanov (born 5 June 1985) is a former Russian professional football player.

Club career
He played 3 seasons in the Russian Football National League for FC Metallurg-Kuzbass Novokuznetsk.

Personal life
His younger brother Andrei Nagumanov is also a footballer.

External links
 
 

1985 births
Footballers from Saint Petersburg
Living people
Russian footballers
Association football midfielders
FC Zenit-2 Saint Petersburg players
FC Novokuznetsk players
FC Saturn Ramenskoye players
FK Daugava (2003) players
FK Žalgiris players
A Lyga players
Russian expatriate footballers
Expatriate footballers in Latvia
Expatriate footballers in Lithuania
Russian expatriates in Latvia